Boxing at the 2018 Summer Youth Olympics was held from 14 to 18 October at the Oceania Pavilion in Buenos Aires, Argentina.

Qualification
Each National Olympic Committee (NOC) can enter a maximum of 5 competitors, 3 males and 2 females with a maximum of 1 competitor in each weight category. As hosts, Argentina was given three quotas (2 boys and 1 girl) to compete and a further 10 quotas, 7 males and 3 females were given to the Tripartite Commission. The remaining 69 places are to be decided through qualification events, namely the 2017 Women's Youth World Championship and continental qualification events.

To be eligible to participate at the Youth Olympics athletes must have been born between 1 January 2000 and 31 December 2001. Furthermore, all athletes must have participated at an AIBA Women's Youth World Championships or at a Youth Continental Championship.

Qualification events

Qualification summary

Medal summary

Medal table

Boys' events

Girls' events

References

External links

Official Results Book – Boxing

 
2018 Summer Youth Olympics events
Youth Summer Olympics
2018
International boxing competitions hosted by Argentina